Launch Complex 4  may refer to:

 Cytochrome c oxidase, a component of the electron transport system
 Cape Canaveral Air Force Station Launch Complex 4, one of the first series of launch complexes to be built at Cape Canaveral Air Force Station, used in the 1950s.
 Vandenberg Air Force Base Space Launch Complex 4, a launch site at Vandenberg Air Force Base, currently active.